Walter Lane Smith III (April 29, 1936 – June 13, 2005) was an American actor. His well-known roles included newspaper editor Perry White in the ABC series Lois & Clark: The New Adventures of Superman, Walter Warner in Son in Law, collaborator entrepreneur Nathan Bates in the NBC television series V, Mayor Bates in the film Red Dawn, Coach Jack Reilly in The Mighty Ducks, district attorney Jim Trotter III in My Cousin Vinny, U.S. Congressman Dick Dodge in The Distinguished Gentleman and U.S. President Richard Nixon in The Final Days, for which he received a Golden Globe award nomination.

Early life
Lane Smith was born in 1936 in Memphis, Tennessee. He graduated from the Leelanau School, a boarding school in Glen Arbor, Michigan, and spent one year boarding at the Hill School in Pottstown, Pennsylvania, before studying at the Actors Studio in the late 1950s and early 1960s along with Dustin Hoffman and Al Pacino; he was recognized in their Hall of Fame. Smith served two years in the United States Army.

Career
After graduating, Smith found steady work in New York theater before making his film debut in Maidstone in 1970. During the 1970s, he regularly made appearances in small film roles including Rooster Cogburn in 1975 and Network in 1976. In 1981, Smith appeared in the Sidney Lumet-directed film Prince of the City. He also acted on television, notably playing a United States Marine in Vietnam in the television miniseries A Rumor of War and in the 1980 Hallmark Hall of Fame TV movie Gideon's Trumpet starring Henry Fonda, José Ferrer and John Houseman. Smith is also credited for playing McMurphy 650 times in the 1971 Off-Broadway revival of One Flew Over The Cuckoo's Nest.

Smith made a major breakthrough in 1984 with significant roles in Red Dawn, Places in the Heart and the television series V. He also played on Quincy, M.E. in season 8, episode 7, "Science for Sale" as an oncologist searching for a cure to cancer. In 1989, Smith gained recognition for his portrayal of Richard Nixon in the docudrama The Final Days. Newsweek praised the performance, writing, "[Smith] is such a good Nixon that his despair and sorrow at his predicament become simply overwhelming." Smith earned a Golden Globe nomination for his performance. He also appeared in the original Broadway stage production of David Mamet's Glengarry Glen Ross as James Lingk. He received a Drama Desk Award for his performance.

In 1990, Smith appeared in Air America playing a United States Senator, a role for which he was selected based on his resemblance to then-Minority Leader Bob Dole. Two years later, he played a powerful and corrupt United States Congressman opposite Eddie Murphy in The Distinguished Gentleman, followed by a role as a small-town district attorney opposite Joe Pesci in My Cousin Vinny, and as Coach Jack Reilly in The Mighty Ducks. In 1993, Smith was cast as Perry White in Lois & Clark: The New Adventures of Superman, which he played for four seasons until 1997. In 1994, he portrayed New York Yankees front officeman Ron in The Scout, alongside Albert Brooks and Brendan Fraser. In 1998, Smith appeared in a major role as fictional television anchorman Emmett Seaborn in the HBO miniseries From The Earth to the Moon. His final film appearance was in The Legend of Bagger Vance (2000).

Death
Smith was diagnosed with amyotrophic lateral sclerosis (also known as ALS, or Lou Gehrig's disease) in April 2004. He died of the disease at home in the Northridge neighborhood of Los Angeles, California, on June 13, 2005, aged 69. He was survived by his wife, Debbie Benedict Smith, and his son Robert Smith.

Filmography

Film

Television

References

External links

Lane Smith at the Internet Off-Broadway Database

1936 births
2005 deaths
Male actors from Memphis, Tennessee
American male film actors
American male television actors
Neurological disease deaths in California
Deaths from motor neuron disease
20th-century American male actors
The Hill School alumni